The Pancharatna kritis (transliterated as Pañcaratna kṛti) (Sanskrit: pancha "five" + ratna "gems") are a set of five kritis (songs) in Carnatic classical music, composed by the 18th-century Indian composer Tyagaraja. All the kritis, as is the case with almost all of Tyagaraja's compositions, are penned in Telugu, except the first one, which is composed in Sanskrit. The songs are: "Jagadananda karaka", "Dudukugala Nanne", "Sadhinchene", "Kanakana Ruchira" and "Endaro Mahanubhavulu".

Tyagaraja and the Pancharatna Kritis
Tyagaraja lived in the late 18th century and early 19th century in Tiruvarur in present-day Thanjavur district in Tamil Nadu. His compositions are considered to be some of the finest in Carnatic music. Of the five Pancharatna Kritis, four are in Telugu and one in Sanskrit. They are set to music in five ragas: Nata, Gaula, Arabhi, Varali and Sri.

Composition
The Pancharatna kritis were written in praise of the Hindu deity Rama. They are set to Adi Tala and each raga represents the mood of the song and the meaning of its lyrics. All the kritis were composed in the style of a Ragam Tanam Pallavi (RTP) with the charanams (stanzas) substituting for the kalpana swaras (improvisatory passages) in the pallavi section of the RTP.

The Pancharatna Kritis are:
 Jagadananda Karaka (Ragam Natai)
 Duduku gala (Ragam Goula)
 Sadhinchene (Ragam Arabhi)
 Kanakana Ruchira (Ragam Varali)
 Endaro Mahanubhavulu (Shree Ragam)

The melodic forms of these compositions (Nata, Goula, Arabhi, Varali, Sri) are the five Ghana ragas of Carnatic music, also called the ghanapanchaka. These five ragas lend themselves to elaborate improvisations. They are so called because they are suited for playing tanam on the veena. Nata and Varali are the most ancient of the Carnatic ragas and date back to over a thousand years ago.

A particularly difficult musical challenge has been taken up successfully by Tyagaraja in three of these compositions. The raga Naata has a particularly distinctive use of the dhaivatam note or swara (A in the C scale of Western classical notes). Tyagaraja has avoided the dhaivatam completely in the first Pancharatna Kriti without losing the swarupa, or character, of the ragam. Similarly gandharam is a note of some beauty in Goula (E in the C scale). Tyagaraja has made minimal use of this note, without losing the character of the ragam. Finally, he avoids dhaivatam in Sri ragam, again a note that is present in some very characteristic sancharas (phrases) of this ragam.

Lyrical synopsis

Jagadānanda kārakā
In this song, Tyagaraja praises Ramachandra, one of the incarnations of Lord Vishnu. He eulogizes Ramachandra as one who is the cause of all bliss in the universe. This is the only Pancharatna Kriti that was composed in Sanskrit. All the other kritis were composed in Telugu, which was used in the court of the Maratha king Sarabhoji who ruled this area in the 18th century. Rama was Tyagaraja's favorite god. The kriti is set to Nata raga.

Duḍukugala nannē dora koḍuku brōchurā yentō
In this second Pancharatna Kriti composed in Telugu, Tyagaraja lists all the errors he has committed in his life and asks who but Rama could redeem such a sinner. The sins described include: just wandering around as though being satisfied with a full meal, giving sermons to people who are not interested in listening or who do not have the capability to understand, self-styling oneself as a great person, and mistaking the dross for the real thing. He lists four categories of people to whom he has made the claim of greatness; the ignorant, the riff-raff, the low social folk and women. In a play on words, he reproaches those who desire wives and progeny. The kriti is set to Gowla raga.

Sādhinchene ō manasā
This Pancharatna Kriti was composed in Telugu and has been set to Arabhi raga. It is written in a playful tone, rich with metaphor and simile without a surfeit of adjectives - all the while arresting the attention of the singers. In this kriti, Tyagaraja sings the greatness of the lord Krishna in a lucid manner. The style adopted in this kriti is very sweet in comparison with the other four.

Kana kana ruci rā kanaka vasana ninnu
This is the least sung or performed of the five Pancharatna Kritis composed in Telugu, but it is considered by some to be the most lingering and beautiful. It describes the divine beauty of Sri Rama, whom Tyagaraja worshiped. He says that the more he Tyagaraja looks upon His beautiful features, the more his mind is attracted to Him Sri Rama. This composition is rarely taught, and rarely heard in concerts, owing to the raga it is set to Varali raga.

Endarō mahānubhāvulu

Endarō mahānubhāvulu is believed to be one of the earlier kritis Tyagaraja composed in Telugu. The song is a salutation to and praise of all the great saints and musicians down the ages. Tyagaraja clearly delineates and lists the Mahanubhavalu, or great ones, in the kriti itself, mentioning the saints Narada and Saunaka, among others. In this kriti, Tyagaraja describes the greatness of devotees of the Lord. The belief in Kerala and Tamil Nadu is that Tyagaraja composed the kriti spontaneously in his joy upon hearing the divine music of the Malayali singer Shadkala Govinda Marar. But according to the Walajapet disciples' version of the origin of the kriti, it was composed and learned by Tyagaraja's disciples before the arrival of Marar. This, according to P. T. Narendra Menon, was the legendary, historically significant meeting between two great musicians. Since Endharo mahanubhavalu is said to have been composed by Tyagaraja at a young age, it is possible that after hearing Marar sing and in appreciation of the greatness of Marar, Tyagaraja could have asked his disciples to sing the kriti on this occasion. Humility is the foundation of all. The kriti is set to Shri raga

Miscellaneous
M. S. Subbulakshmi, Maharajapuram Santhanam, and Mangalampalli Balamuralikrishna are among the hundreds of great Indian classical vocalists who have brought these kritis closer to the modern world.

References

External links
 Raga Nata
 https://web.archive.org/web/20090701122201/http://www.esnips.com/doc/872abe7c-0325-455a-9389-495e6709c8be/Kanakanaruchira
 https://web.archive.org/web/20080727024355/http://www.esnips.com/web/Pancharatna-Kriti/
 https://www.youtube.com/watch?v=iUi5MJuCemM  (Majestic Nattai)
 Meaning, Word by Word
 https://www.youtube.com/watch?v=IUdls4HJ6Wo Jagadananda Karaka - Balamuralikrishna - Tyagaraja Pancharatna Kriti

Carnatic compositions
18th-century songs
Telugu-language songs